Robert "Robbie" Williams (born 12 April 1979 in Liverpool, Merseyside) is an English footballer playing for Warrington Town.

Accrington Stanley
Williams signed for Accrington Stanley in July 1999 from Liverpool County Football Combination side St Dominics. He played for the club for ten years, making 238 league appearances for the club, and picking up championship winning medals for the Northern Premier Division One in 2000, the Northern Premier League in 2003 and the Conference National in 2006, seeing the club promoted to the Football League.

Illegal betting and subsequent ban
In April 2009, Williams, who at the time was the club's longest serving player, along Stanley teammates Peter Cavanagh, Jay Harris and David Mannix and Bury player Andy Mangan were charged with breaching the Football Association's betting rules, with some accused of gambling thousands of pounds on their team to lose. The scandal related to Accrington Stanley's last game of the last League Two season, at home to Bury.

In July 2009, the players (except Cavanagh, whose case was to be heard at a later date) were banned for varying lengths after being found guilty of being involved in betting on a Bury win when the Shakers visited the Crown Ground at the end of the 2007/08 season – a game that Bury went on to win. Williams was suspended from professional football for eight months and received a £3,500 fine, and was released by Stanley. The players appealed against their bans but lost their cases.

Southport
In March 2010 he agreed to join Southport and finally joined up with the club in May.

Warrington Town
In October 2012 he signed for Warrington Town making his club debut on 13 October in a 1–1 draw with Salford City.

Honours
Northern Premier Division One (VII): 2000
Northern Premier League (VI): 2003
Conference National (V): 2006

References

External links

Living people
1979 births
English footballers
Association football defenders
Accrington Stanley F.C. players
Southport F.C. players
English Football League players
National League (English football) players
Footballers from Liverpool
Warrington Town F.C. players
Northern Premier League players
Sportspeople involved in betting scandals